Brady v. Maryland, 373 U.S. 83 (1963), was a landmark United States Supreme Court case that established that the prosecution must turn over all evidence that might exonerate the defendant (exculpatory evidence) to the defense. The prosecution failed to do so for Brady, and he was convicted. Brady challenged his conviction, arguing it had been contrary to the Due Process Clause of the Fourteenth Amendment to the United States Constitution.

Background
On June 27, 1958, a 25-year-old Maryland man named John Leo Brady and his 24-year-old companion Charles Donald Boblit murdered 53-year-old acquaintance William Brooks. Both men were convicted and sentenced to death. Brady admitted to being involved in the murder, but he claimed that Boblit had done the actual killing and that they had stolen Brooks' car ahead of a planned bank robbery but had not planned to kill him. The prosecution had withheld a written statement by Boblit (the men were tried separately), confessing that he had committed the act of killing by himself. The Maryland Court of Appeals had affirmed the conviction and remanded the case for a retrial only on the question of punishment. Brady's lawyer, E. Clinton Bamberger Jr., appealed the case to the Supreme Court, hoping for a new trial.

Decision
The Supreme Court held that withholding exculpatory evidence violates due process "where the evidence is material either to guilt or to punishment." The Court determined that under Maryland law, the withheld evidence could not have exculpated the defendant but was material to his level of punishment. Thus, the Maryland Court of Appeals' ruling was affirmed – Brady would receive a new sentencing hearing but not a new trial.

William O. Douglas wrote: "We now hold that the suppression by the prosecution of evidence favorable to an accused upon request violates due process where the evidence is material either to guilt or to punishment... Society wins not only when the guilty are convicted, but when criminal trials are fair."

A defendant's request for "Brady disclosure" refers to the holding of the Brady case, and the numerous state and federal cases that interpret its requirement that the prosecution disclose material exculpatory evidence to the defense. Exculpatory evidence is "material" if "there is a reasonable probability that his conviction or sentence would have been different had these materials been disclosed." Brady evidence includes statements of witnesses or physical evidence that conflicts with the prosecution's witnesses and evidence that could allow the defense to impeach the credibility of a prosecution witness.

Aftermath
Brady was given a new hearing, where his sentence was commuted to life imprisonment. Brady was ultimately paroled. He moved to Florida, where he worked as a truck driver, started a family and did not re-offend.

Police officers who have been dishonest are sometimes referred to as "Brady cops". Because of the Brady ruling, prosecutors are required to notify defendants and their attorneys whenever a law enforcement official involved in their case has a confirmed record of knowingly lying in an official capacity. This requirement has been understood by lawyers and jurists as requiring prosecutors to maintain lists, known as Brady lists, of police officers who are not credible witnesses and whose involvement in a case undermines a prosecution's integrity.

Brady has become not only a matter of defendants' due process trial rights, but also of police officers’ due process employment rights. Officers and their unions have used litigation, legislation, and informal political pressure to push back on Bradys application to their personnel files. This conflict over Bradys application creates a divide between prosecutors and police officers, and between police management and police labor. Brady evidence also includes evidence material to credibility of a non-police witness, such as evidence of false statements by the witness or evidence that a witness was paid to act as an informant.

In United States v. Bagley (1985), the Court narrowed the reach of Brady by stating the suppressed evidence had to be "exculpatory" and "material" for a violation to result in the reversal of a conviction. Harry Blackmun wrote in Bagley that "only if there is a reasonable probability that, had the evidence been disclosed to the defense, the result of the proceeding would have been different. A 'reasonable probability' is a probability sufficient to undermine confidence in the outcome."

See also 

 List of United States Supreme Court cases, volume 373
 Brady material
 Connick v. Thompson
 Giglio v. United States
 Jencks Act
 Jencks v. United States
 Pitchess motion
 Testilying
 R v Stinchcombe, Canadian Supreme Court judgment on a similar subject

References

Sources 
 
 
 
 Hooper, Laural L.; Marsh, Jennifer E.; and Yeh, Brian. Treatment of Brady v. Maryland Material in United States District and State Courts’ Rules, Orders, and Policies: Report to the Advisory Committee on Criminal Rules of the Judicial Conference of the United States, Federal Judicial Center, October 2004.

External links 
 
 The Brady List, a public-facing database of information including police misconduct, public complaints and use-of-force reports

Brady material case law
United States Supreme Court cases
United States Supreme Court cases of the Warren Court
1963 in United States case law